Thanasis Costakis (1907–2009) was a Greek linguist and lexicographer best known for his work on the critically endangered Tsakonian language spoken in the eastern Peloponnese.

Costakis was born in Pera Melana in Arcadia, a Tsakonian-speaking village.  Costakis taught at several gymnasia and lycea in Athens before affiliating with the Academy of Athens (modern), where he contributed to the composition of the Historical Lexicon of Modern Greek. In addition to his linguistic works, he also published a volume on the traditional architecture of Tsakonia. Costakis also developed a writing system for the Tsakonian language, which included orthography using dots, spiritus asper, and caron for use in his works, which has been used in his grammar and local editions of dialectical texts.

Works
Historical Lexicon of Modern Greek, The Academy of Athens, Athens: 1933–present (contributor)
A Brief Grammar of the Tsakonian Dialect, The French Institute of Athens, Athens: 1951.
Tsakonian Popular Architecture, The Academy of Athens, Athens: 1961.
Le parler grec d'Anakou, Centre for Asia Minor Studies, Athens: 1964.
The Tsakonian of Propontis, The Academy of Athens, Athens: 1979.
Lexicon of the Tsakonian Dialect, The Academy of Athens: 1986.

References

External links
Biography at the University of Patras website (in Greek)

1907 births
2009 deaths
Linguists from Greece
Greek lexicographers
Greek educators
Tsakonia
People from Arcadia, Peloponnese
20th-century linguists
20th-century lexicographers